Batiste is a lightweight woven fabric.

Batiste may also refer to:

People
Batiste (surname)
Batiste Madalena (1902–1988), American commercial artist

See also

Baptiste (disambiguation)
Baptist (disambiguation)
Batista
Battiste